Ivan Choma or Khoma (27 November 1923 – 3 February 2006) was a Ukrainian Greek Catholic hierarch and ecclesiastical historian in Italy. He was the titular bishop of Patara and from 22 February 1996 until his death on 3 February 2006 and the Procurator of the Head of the Ukrainian Greek-Catholic Church to the Holy See.

Biography
He was born in Khyriv (present day – in Lviv Oblast, Ukraine) to the Ukrainian Greek-Catholic family of Osyp, a railway worker, and Kateryna Choma in 1923. After graduation from the male gymnasia in Sambir and Przemyśl, he joined the theological seminary in Przemyśl, but was forced to interrupt his studies because the Second World War and subsequently continued in the theological seminary in Prešov (present day Slovakia). In 1946, he emigrated to Italy and graduated from Pontifical Urbaniana University. He was ordained as a priest on 29 June 1949 by Bishop Ivan Buchko for the Eparchy of Przemyśl, Sambir and Sanok. He completed his theological studies with Doctor of Theology degree in 1951.

Choma worked as a second personal assistant for Archbishop Buchko and, from 1963, as the secretary of Cardinal Josyf Slipyj. He was an editor-in-chief of the principal Ukrainian scientific-theological magazine, Bohosloviye (1960–1997).

He was consecrated to the episcopate on 2 April 1977 in the Castel Gandolfo chapel by Major Archbishop Slipyj without papal permission (apostolic mandate) in an act which caused many irritations in the Roman Curia, He was recognised as a bishop by the Holy See and appointed as the Titular Bishop of Patara on 22 February 1996.

He died in Rome on 3 February 2006.

References 

1923 births
2006 deaths
People from Lviv Oblast
People from Lwów Voivodeship
Pontifical Urban University alumni
Ukrainian male writers
Ukrainian historians of religion
20th-century Eastern Catholic bishops
21st-century Eastern Catholic bishops
Bishops of the Ukrainian Greek Catholic Church
Soviet emigrants to Italy
Ukrainian diaspora in Italy
Bishops of Przemyśl